Siloam Springs State Park is an Illinois state park on  in Adams and Brown counties, Illinois, United States.

References

State parks of Illinois
Protected areas of Adams County, Illinois
Protected areas established in 1940
Protected areas of Brown County, Illinois
1940 establishments in Illinois